Hootan Shakiba (born June 14, 1984) is an Iranian-Kurdish actor. He is best known for his role as Habib in Bachelors (2016–2019) which earned him a Hafez Award. Shakiba won the Crystal Simorgh for Best Actor for portraying Abdolhamid Rigi in When the Moon Was Full (2019).

Early life
Shakiba was born on June 14, 1984, in Tehran and grew up in Sanandaj. He received a Bachelor's degree in theater directing from Soore University and a Master's degree in acting from University of Arts.

Career

2008–2012: Career beginnings
Shakiba started acting at age 18 with working in theatre and short films. He played his first major and professional work in 2008 with Tune Your Violins play which earned him his first acting award at the 11th Iran International University Theater Festival.

In 2009 he played in Marat/Sade play and earned a Honorary Diploma at the 12th Iran International University Theater Festival.

In 2012 he acted in Mad Toy play and received the first place acting prize at the 19th International Children and Youth Theater Festival.

He played 21 plays between 2008–2012 and became known on theater industry.

2013–2018: Feature debut and Bachelors 
He made his feature debut with a supporting role in Kaveh Sajjadi Hosseini's Night Out as Tomaj. The film was screened at the 32nd Fajr Film Festival on experimental section then it released in February 2015 in Iran theatrically, two years after the film premiere.

In 2013, He starred in Voice of Silence and Sensitive Floor, both were also screened at the 32nd Fajr Film Festival and earned awards and nominations.

He received the Best Theater Actor of the Year Award at the 11th Theater Actor Celebration for his acting in Timequake (2013).

In 2014–2015, 2018 he did the voice acting for Dibi and The Next Door characters in the popular Red Hat television series directed by Iraj Tahmasb.

He also starred in Kamal Tabrizi's first web series Fool (2014–2015) as Mehrdad alongside Mohsen Tanabandeh, Hanieh Tavassoli, Mehran Ahmadi, Majid Salehi, Ahmad Mehranfar, Shabnam Moghaddami and Behnam Tashakor.

He earned a Best Theater Actor of the Year nomination at the 13th Theater Actor Celebration for his performance in The Hole (2015) .

In 2016, Shakiba Starred in Bachelors television series directed by Soroush Sehat and gained a lot of recognition and became well known among the audience. He received critical acclaim for his performance as Habib and earned his first Hafez Award and a Jam-e-Jam Television Festival nomination.

In 2017 he played in Oliver Twist play as Fagin and received critical acclaim for his performance as well as a nomination for Best Actor at the 36th Fajr Theater Festival and a Special Acting Prize award at the 15th Theater Actor Celebration.

for his performance in the play 100% (2018) he received critical acclaim and a Honorary Diploma at the 36th Fajr Theater Festival.

In 2018 he earned his second Hafez Award nomination for Bachelors second season.

In 2018, Shakiba played as Monsieur Thénardier in the big production tragedy musical play Les Miserables, alongside Navid Mohammadzadeh, Parinaz Izadyar, Sahar Dolatshahi and Parsa Pirouzfar. Shakiba and Dolatshahi's acting as Monsieur Thénardier and Madame Thénardier was praised by the critics and both received Hafez Award nominations at the first Hafez Theater Award. The play was a commercial success.

He played 17 plays between 2013–2018 and gained attention.

2019: Wide recognition through When the Moon Was Full
In 2019, He starred as Abdolhamid Rigi the elder brother of the detained leader of Jundallah, Abdolmalek Rigi in Narges Abyar's acclaimed When the Moon Was Full, the film screened for the first time at the 37th Fajr Film Festival.

Shakiba received critical acclaimed and was highly praised by both audience and critics. he earned various accolades including Crystal Simorgh for Best Actor and Hafez Award for Best Actor, in addition to nominations for an Iran's Film Critics and Writers Association award and an Iran Cinema Celebration award. Shakiba and his co-star Shakerdoost both won Crystal Simorgh for their performances making them the second couple to do so. (Hedieh Tehrani and Mohammad Reza Foroutan were the first ones)

The film also won the Crystal Simorgh for Best Film and Best Director and received critical acclaim and was a commercial success.

he played in the play Oslo (2019) directed by Yousef Bapiri on Iranshahr Theater stage.

The third season of Bachelors aird under the name of Masters from 8 November to 7 December for 28 episodes and became one of the most watched series of the year.

2020–2021: Crystal Simorgh snub
After his critically acclaimed role in When the Moon Was Full, Shakiba starred in Soheil Beiraghi's Pulp (2020) as Milad Bodaghi, an LGBT-related character who became friends with an old lady (played by Fatemeh Motamed Arya). The film screened for the first time at the 38th Fajr Film Festival.

In February 2020, He played in Atila Pesyani's play Qajari's Coffee alongside Navid Mohammadzadeh.

At the 39th Fajr Film Festival Shakiba participated with two films TiTi and Pinto, both alongside Elnaz Shakerdoost.

He played as Amir Sasan, an alcoholic wedding singer who is abusive to his wife in Ida Panahandeh's TiTi (2021).

Shakiba collaborated with Narges Abyar for the second time in Pinto (2021), where he plays a gambler who is a (wife) beater with a short temper. the acting was praised by the critics but on 10 February when the nominees were announced, Shakiba wasn't nominated. this was one of the biggest snubs of the festival.

Shakerdoost shared a post on her Instagram account and expressed her feelings about the snubs: "Due to not seeing your name, I haven't been able to be happy even for a second about my candidacy, because I don't know the result of the audience's belief in my role apart from my co-star."  "..I have always been silent, but this time, knowledge did not allow me not to testify to your unceasing efforts, to your powerful acting and to your patience, I am grateful to you."

Pinto won the Crystal Simorgh for Audience Choice of Best Film.

Shakiba later earned an Iran's Film Critics and Writers Association award nomination for Best Supporting Actor for his performance in Pinto.

He played in Bonus (2021) short film directed by Reza Nejati which received critical acclaim and won the Crystal Simorgh for Best Short Film at the 40th Fajr Film Festival. Shakiba earned an Iranian Short Film Association nomination for Best Performance for his role in Bonus as a Teacher.

2022: Party and Conjugal Visit
On July 31, 2021, it was announced that Shakiba will star in Omid Shams feature debut romance drama Conjugal Visit (2022) alongside Parinaz Izadyar. The film screened for the first time at the Main Competition of 40th Fajr Film Festival.

One day before the closing ceremony and award presentation, the Fajr Film Festival announced that they will not give the Crystal Simorgh for Audience Choice of Best Film this year.

By that time, the analysis of the sales of 22 films in the competition section of the 40th Fajr Film Festival showed that Conjugal Visit was the best-selling film of the festival with 818 million tomans, and in a shoulder-to-shoulder competition with 4 million tomans more than Mohammad Hossein Mahdavian's The Loser Man (2022).

Conjugal Visit had the first place on the voting section on the last ten days of the festival. on February 10, 2022, when The nominees for the 40th Fajr Film Festival were announced at a press conference, everyone was shocked that the film had only two nominations for Best Supporting Actor and Best First Film. this was the biggest snub of the festival.

The film was named by Film Emrooz the second best film of the festival, it was also named the best film of the festival by Cinematicket and Salamcinema users.

The acting and direction was highly praised by the critics. at the eighth Urban International Film Festival, Shakiba was nominated for Best Actor Award. at the festival, the film won the award for Best Film, shared with Majid Majidi's critically acclaimed Sun Children.

He played as Farhad, an English Teacher who is in prison for some reasons and has fell in love with his inmate's daughter Parvaneh.

On March 10, it was announced that he will be doing the voice acting of two characters in Iraj Tahmasb's talk show Party (2022). the first episode was released on 22 March.

Among the two characters (Shabash and Bacheh), Bacheh became so popular among the people. Most of the time, Bacheh is seen in a state of anger and fights and argues with people over various issues. Because of his job (flower seller), he is very sensitive to his flowers and gets angry if someone is careless about his flowers or talks to him in a bad tone. He uses rude and nasty words during fights and anger, and according to himself, he enjoys this work. The child has a foul-mouthed and obscene personality. However, the child has a sheltered and kind personality so that if he feels intimacy and friendship with someone, he will talk to him in a calm and pleading tone. His famous phrase "not your business honey" became so popular in Iran.

2023: Upcoming projects 
On February 17, 2023, the first episode of Shahram Shah Hosseini's romance web series Set Me Free was released on Filimo, starring Shakiba as Hatef alongside Mohsen Tanabandeh.

Some reliable sources have stated that Shakiba will be starring in Narges Abyar's period drama web series Savushun, and Soroush Sehat's comedy web series How Many Springs Does Life Have.

Filmography

Film

Web

Television

Theatre

Awards and nominations

References

External links
 

1984 births
Living people
Kurdish people
Iranian comedians
People from Tehran
Iranian male actors
Kurdish male actors
People from Sanandaj
Iranian male voice actors
Iranian male television actors
Crystal Simorgh for Best Actor winners